Edward Balchowsky (February 16, 1916 – November 27, 1989) was an American poet, artist, musician, composer who served in the Abraham Lincoln Brigade during the Spanish Civil War.  Although he lost a hand, in Spain, Balchowsky became an important figure in the Chicago Arts Scene.  Four well-known singer-songwriters wrote songs inspired by Balchowsky, Jimmy Buffett, Loudon Wainwright, Utah Phillips and Dion Dimucci.

Early life

Balchowsky's father was a grocer, and his family the only Jewish family in Frankfort, Illinois, a community largely settled by individuals from a German ethnic background.  He was a skilled musician, as a youth, and hoped to be a concert pianist.

Volunteer in Spain

Balchowsky traveled to Spain, to volunteer to fight to defend communism, during the Spanish Civil War, in the International Brigades.  He left in October 1937.  He was widely described as serving in the Abraham Lincoln Brigade, but he told Studs Terkel that he had chosen to spend most of his time in Spain with British units, because he found a group of creative people there.

Casualties were high among the foreign volunteers.  They were poorly equipped, and some had only on the job training in how to be a soldier.  Balchowsky was one of only six survivors from a unit of 80 men who had been pinned down by Spanish Fascist forces.  Balchowsky's right wrist was shattered by a machine gun bullet during this engagement, and he eventually had to have his hand amputated.  He continued to serve as a soldier, charged with reconnaissance.

All foreign volunteers were demobilized and sent home in late 1938.  Balchowsky returned on December 31, 1938.

Chicago Bohemian feature

Balchowsky faced problems adapting to civilian life, with only one hand, when he returned from Spain.  He re-learned how to play the piano, with only one hand.  He was able to arrange songs, including classical music, so he could play them, with just one hand.  Chopin had been his favorite classical composer, in his youth, when he was mastering the Piano. He said that, when he was a student, he had played Chopin, and, after his injury, he played with Chopin. He sometimes accompanied other musicians.  He also sold paintings and drawings to make ends meet.

He sought relief for phantom pain in his missing hand through alcohol and opiates, which brought financial insecurity, but was able to make ends meet, without resorting to begging or theft.

He was convicted, and served time in prison.  While there he taught an illiterate man, on death row, how to read.  The progress his friend made helped him get his death sentence commuted.

Interviews with Balchowsky were included in multiple films about Americans who had served in Spain. Diane Weyermann produced in 1989 a mini-documentary about Balchowsky, entitled Peat Bog Soldier.

Studs Terkel interviewed Balchowsky in 1970.  During the interview Balchowsky described what it was like to serve in Spain, and sang several of the soldier's songs.

The Associated Press quoted Terkel, when Balchowsky died, in 1989.

Folk Singer Utah Phillips wrote Eddy's Song about Balchowsky, and Jimmy Buffett said Balchowsky was an inspiration to him, in general, and specifically inspired the song He Went to Paris.

In 1988 Balchowsky published a memoir, entitled As You Pass Each Fence and Door.

References

Further reading

External links 
 Spanish Civil War veteran Eddie Balchowsky, on YouTube

1916 births
1989 deaths
American communists
American male poets
Abraham Lincoln Brigade members
American amputees
20th-century American male writers